The Shire of Tungamah was a local government area in the Goulburn Valley region, about  northeast of Melbourne, the state capital of Victoria, Australia.

History

Tungamah was once part of the vast Echuca Road District, which formed in 1864, and became and a shire from 1871. It extended along the south bank of the Murray River, from Mount Hope Creek in the west, to the Ovens River in the east.

Tungamah was first incorporated as the Shire of Yarrawonga on 15 May 1878. On 17 April 1891, the East Riding, which contained the town of Yarrawonga, was severed and incorporated as the Shire of North Yarrawonga. As such, the shire was renamed Tungamah, after its main town, on 17 February 1893, and North Yarrawonga was renamed Yarrawonga on 12 May 1893. On 1 April 1953, the North West Riding also severed, becoming the Shire of Cobram.

On 18 November 1994, the Shire of Tungamah was abolished, and along with the Shires of Cobram, Nathalia, Numurkah and Yarrawonga, was merged into the newly created Shire of Moira. The Katandra West district was transferred to the newly created City of Greater Shepparton.

Wards

The Shire of Tungamah was divided into four ridings on 1 October 1964, each of which elected three councillors:
 Central Riding
 South Riding
 South West (Katandra) Riding
 North West (Invergordon) Riding

Towns and localities
 Almonds
 Boosey
 Boweya North
 Invergordon
 Katandra
 Lake Rowan
 Marunga
 Pelluebla
 St James
 Telford
 Tungamah*
 Waggarandall
 Youanmite
 Youarang
 Yundool

* Council seat.

Population

* Estimate in the 1958 Victorian Year Book.

References

External links
 Victorian Places - Tungamah

Tungamah